In electrical engineering and acoustics, immittance is a concept combining the impedance and admittance of a system or circuit. The term immittance was invented by H. W. Bode.

It is sometimes convenient to use immittance to refer to a complex number which may be either the impedance (ratio of voltage to current in electrical circuits, or sound pressure to volume velocity in acoustical systems) or the admittance (ratio of current to voltage, or volume velocity to sound pressure) of a system. In audiology, tympanometry is sometimes called immittance testing.

Immittance does not have units since it applies to both impedance and admittance, which have different units. However, in certain theoretical work it may be necessary to deal with general functions, which afterward will be specialised to become either an impedance or an admittance by the assignment of suitable units; in such cases it is convenient to refer to the functions as immittances.

In electronics, the "immittance" Smith chart simply has both the impedance and admittance grids on the same chart, which is useful for cascading series-connected with parallel-connected electric circuits.

References

Physical quantities
Electrical parameters